Sidwell may refer to:

Saint Sidwell, a British saint
St Sidwells, a church and a city center area in Exeter
Steve Sidwell, English football player with Brighton & Hove Albion F.C.
Sidwell Friends School, a Quaker school in the United States